The 2011 ICC World Cricket League Division Six was a cricket tournament that took place from 17 to 24 September 2011. It formed part of the ICC World Cricket League and qualifying for the 2015 Cricket World Cup.

The host country for this tournament was Malaysia.

Teams
The teams that took part in the tournament were decided according to the results of the 2009 ICC World Cricket League Division Six, the 2010 ICC World Cricket League Division Five and the 2011 ICC World Cricket League Division Seven.

Squads

Points table

Matches

Playoffs

5th place playoff

3rd place playoff

Final

Statistics

Most runs
The top five highest run scorers (total runs) are included in this table.

Most wickets
The following table contains the five leading wicket-takers.

Final Placings

After the conclusion of the tournament the teams were distributed as follows:

References

https://web.archive.org/web/20120406115546/http://icc-cricket.yahoo.net/newsdetails.php?newsId=13910_1302162060

2011 Division Six